York County is the southwesternmost county in the U.S. state of Maine, along the state of New Hampshire's eastern border. It is divided from Strafford County, New Hampshire, by the Salmon Falls River, and the connected tidal estuary—the Piscataqua River. York County was permanently established in 1639. It is the state's oldest county and one of the oldest in the United States. Several of Maine's earliest colonial settlements are found in the county. As of the 2020 census, its population was 211,972, making it Maine's second-most populous county. Its county seat is Alfred. York County is part of the Portland–South Portland, Maine Metropolitan Statistical Area.

History

1622 patent
The first patent establishing the Province of Maine was granted on August 10, 1622, to Ferdinando Gorges and John Mason by the Plymouth Council for New England, which itself had been granted a royal patent by James I to the coast of North America between the 40th and the 48th parallels "from sea to sea". This first patent encompassed the coast between the Merrimack and Kennebec rivers, as well as an irregular parcel of land between the headwaters of the two rivers. In 1629, Gorges and Mason agreed to split the patent at the Piscataqua River, with Mason retaining the land south of the river as the Province of New Hampshire.

Gorges named his more northerly piece of territory New Somersetshire. This venture failed, however, because of lack of funds and colonial settlement. Also failed was a venture by Capt. Christopher Levett, an agent for Gorges and a member of the Council for New England. With the King's blessing, Levett embarked on a scheme to found a colony on the site of present-day Portland. Levett was granted  of land, the first Englishman to own the soil of Portland. There he proposed to found a settlement named York after the city of his birth in England. Ultimately, the project was abandoned, the men Levett left behind disappeared, and Levett died aboard ship on his return to England from the Massachusetts Bay Colony in 1630. One part of Levett's scheme did survive: the name of York, which now adorns the county.

The now-decommissioned Fort Levett on Cushing Island in Casco Bay is named for Capt. Levett.

1639 patent
In 1639, Gorges obtained a renewed patent, the Gorges Patent, for the area between the Piscataqua and Kennebec Rivers, in the form of a royal charter from Charles I of England. The area was roughly the same as that covered in the 1622 patent after the 1629 split with Mason. The second colony also foundered for lack of money and settlers, although it survived the death of Gorges in 1647.

Absorption by Massachusetts
In the 1650s the nearby Massachusetts Bay Colony asserted territorial claims over what is now southern Maine, and by 1658 had completely absorbed what is now southwestern Maine into York County, Massachusetts.

The first known and recorded offer for a purchase of land in York County is in 1668, when Francis Small traded goods with the Newichewannock tribe of this area. Their Chief Wesumbe, also known as Captain Sandy, was friendly with Small and warned him of a plot against his life. A group of renegade tribesmen planned on murdering Small instead of paying him with the furs that were owed to him. Small escaped after watching his house in what is now Cornish, Maine, burn to the ground. Small returned and rebuilt. The Chief made up the loss by selling Small all the lands bounded by the Great and Little Ossipee Rivers, the Saco River, and the New Hampshire border. Known now as the five Ossipee towns, the tract included all of Limington, Limerick, Cornish (formerly named Francisborough), Newfield and Parsonsfield.

The large size of the county led to its division in 1760, with Cumberland and Lincoln counties carved out of its eastern portions. When Massachusetts adopted its state government in 1780, it created the District of Maine to manage its eastern territories. In 1805 the northern portion of York County was separated to form part of Oxford County. When Maine achieved statehood in 1820 all of the counties of the District of Maine became counties of Maine.

Geography

Adjacent counties
Oxford County – north
Cumberland County – northeast
Rockingham County, New Hampshire – southwest
Strafford County, New Hampshire – west
Carroll County, New Hampshire – northwest

National protected area
 Rachel Carson National Wildlife Refuge (part)

Demographics

2000 census
At the 2000 census, there were 186,742 people, 74,563 households and 50,851 families living in the county. There were 94,234 housing units at an average density of 95 per square mile (37/km2). The racial makeup of the county was 97.56% White, 0.42% Black or African American, 0.24% Native American, 0.73% Asian, 0.03% Pacific Islander, 0.17% from other races, and 0.85% from two or more races. 0.70% of the population were Hispanic or Latino of any race. The most cited ethnicities were English (17.9%), French (14.5%), French Canadian (13.9%), Irish (12.5%), United States or American (9.6%) and Italian (5.1%). 90.84% of the population spoke English and 6.92% spoke French as their first language.

There were 74,563 households, of which 32.20% had children under the age of 18 living with them, 55.00% were married couples living together, 9.50% had a female householder with no husband present, and 31.80% were non-families. 24.90% of all households were made up of individuals, and 9.70% had someone living alone who was 65 years of age or older. The average household size was 2.47 and the average family size was 2.96.

Age distribution was 24.80% under the age of 18, 6.90% from 18 to 24, 30.00% from 25 to 44, 24.80% from 45 to 64, and 13.60% who were 65 years of age or older. For every 100 females, there were 94.50 males. For every 100 females age 18 and over, there were 91.40 males. The median age was 38 years.

The median household income was $43,630, and the median family income was $51,419. Males had a median income of $36,317 versus $26,016 for females. The per capita income for the county was $21,225. About 5.90% of families and 8.20% of the population were below the poverty line, including 9.90% of those under age 18 and 8.50% of those age 65 or over.

2010 census
As of the 2010 United States census, there were 197,131 people, 81,009 households, and 53,136 families living in the county. The racial makeup of the county was 96.4% white, 1.1% Asian, 0.6% black or African American, 0.3% American Indian, 0.3% from other races, and 1.4% from two or more races. Those of Hispanic or Latino origin made up 1.3% of the population. In terms of ancestry, 22.3% were English, 19.3% were Irish, 9.8% were French Canadian, 8.1% were German, 7.9% were Italian, 5.8% were American, and 5.6% were Scottish.

Of the 81,009 households, 29.3% had children under the age of 18 living with them, 51.4% were married couples living together, 9.7% had a female householder with no husband present, 34.4% were non-families, and 26.5% of all households were made up of individuals. The average household size was 2.40 and the average family size was 2.89. The median age was 43.0 years.

The median income for a household in the county was $55,008 and the median income for a family was $65,077. Males had a median income of $47,117 versus $34,001 for females. The per capita income for the county was $27,137. About 5.6% of families and 8.5% of the population were below the poverty line, including 10.4% of those under age 18 and 8.1% of those age 65 or over.

Politics
York County has trended Democratic in the second half of the 20th century and into the 21st century. Although home to the Bush family compound, it only supported the Bush family in one of its four presidential runs (that of George H. W. Bush in 1988). At the same time, it has voted for Republican Senator Susan Collins in all of her reelection campaigns, most recently in 2020.

|}

Voter registration

Communities

Cities
 Biddeford
 Saco
 Sanford

Towns

 Acton
 Alfred (county seat)
 Arundel
 Berwick
 Buxton
 Cornish
 Dayton
 Eliot
 Hollis
 Kennebunk
 Kennebunkport
 Kittery
 Lebanon
 Limerick
 Limington
 Lyman
 Newfield
 North Berwick
 Ogunquit
 Old Orchard Beach
 Parsonsfield
 Shapleigh
 South Berwick
 Waterboro
 Wells
 York

Census-designated places

 Alfred
 Berwick
 Cape Neddick
 Cornish
 Kennebunk
 Kennebunkport
 Kezar Falls
 Kittery
 Kittery Point
 Lake Arrowhead
 North Berwick
 South Berwick
 South Eliot
 West Kennebunk
 York Harbor

Unincorporated villages or neighborhoods
 Bald Head
 Bar Mills
 Bedell Crossing
 Cape Porpoise
 East Parsonsfield
 East Waterboro
 Felch Corner
 Ocean Park
 Springvale
 York Beach
 York Cliffs

See also
History of Maine
York County, Maine Tercentenary half dollar, 1936 commemorative coin
National Register of Historic Places listings in York County, Maine

References

Further reading
 W. Woodford Clayton, History of York County, Maine: With Illustrations and Biographical Sketches of Its Prominent Men and Pioneers. Philadelphia: Everts and Peck, 1880.

External links
 Official Website of York County
 Maine Genealogy: York County, Maine

 

 
Maine counties
Portland metropolitan area, Maine
1636 establishments in the Thirteen Colonies
Populated places established in 1636